Peter Arthur "Art" Fierro (born December 20, 1961) is a Texas Democratic politician that served in the Texas House of Representatives for district 79.

Personal life
Fierro's hometown is El Paso, Texas. Fierro has attended El Paso Community College and University of Texas at El Paso. His wife is Annabelle Perez, who is a District Court Judge, have one daughter Julianna. He works as a public relations consultant.

Political career
Fierro served on the El Paso Community College Board of Trustees between 2006 and 2019. Fierro currently serves in the Texas House of Representatives from the 79th district. He assumed office on February 12, 2019. Fierro is affiliated with the Democratic Party.

References

Living people
21st-century American politicians
Democratic Party members of the Texas House of Representatives
Politicians from El Paso, Texas
University of Texas at El Paso alumni
1961 births